The 2021 King Cup Final was the 46th final of the King Cup, Saudi Arabia's main football knock-out competition since its inception in 1957.

The final was played at the King Fahd International Stadium, Riyadh, on 27 May 2021. The match was contested by Al-Taawoun and Al-Faisaly. It will be Al-Taawoun's 3rd King Cup final and Al-Faisaly's 2nd. This will be the first meeting between these two sides in the King Cup. The attendance was capped at 40% after due to the COVID-19 pandemic in Saudi Arabia.

Al-Faisaly defeated Al-Taawoun 3–2 to win their first King Cup title.

Teams

Venue

The King Fahd International Stadium was announced as the final venue on 25 May 2021. This was the eighth King Cup final hosted in the King Fahd International Stadium following those in 1988, 2008, 2009, 2010, 2013, 2019 and 2020.

The King Fahd International Stadium was built in 1982 and was opened in 1987. The stadium was used as a venue for the 1992, 1995, and the 1997 editions of the FIFA Confederations Cup. Its current capacity is 68,752 and it is used by the Saudi Arabia national football team, Al-Hilal, Al-Shabab, and major domestic matches.

Background
Al-Taawoun reached their third final after a 3–2 win against Al-Fateh. This was Al-Taawoun's second final in three years. Al-Taawoun won their first title in 2019 after defeating Al-Ittihad and finished as runners-up in 1990. 

Al-Faisaly reached their second final, after a 1–0 away win against Al-Nassr. This was Al-Faisaly's first final since 2018, which they lost against Al-Ittihad.

The two teams met twice earlier in the season with both matches ending in draws. This was the first meeting between these two sides in the King Cup and the 46th meeting between them in all competitions. In the clubs' 45 previous meetings, Al-Taawoun won 21, Al-Faisaly won 13 and the remaining 11 were drawn.

Road to the final
Note: In all results below, the score of the finalist is given first (H: home; A: away).

Match

Details

{| width="100%"
|valign="top" width="40%"|

Statistics

See also

2020–21 King Cup
2020–21 Saudi Professional League
2021 Saudi Super Cup

Notes

References

External links

2021
Sports competitions in Saudi Arabia
May 2021 sports events in Asia
Al-Taawoun FC matches